Heussenstamm is a surname. Notable people with the surname include:

Frances Heussenstamm (1928–2019), American artist and psychologist
George Heussenstamm (born 1926), American composer
John Heussenstamm (born 1953), American guitarist and music educator
Paul Heussenstamm (born 1949), American painter and lecturer